RFA Cherryleaf (A82) was a Leaf-class small fleet tanker of the Royal Fleet Auxiliary, in service from 1973 to 1980.

History
She was built by Nordseewerke in Emden, Germany and launched in 1962 as Overseas Adventurer for London and Overseas Bulk Carriers, a subsidiary of London & Overseas Freighters (LOF). She was bareboat chartered for the RFA in February 1973 and renamed RFA Cherryleaf.

In 1980 she was returned to LOF and her name reverted to Overseas Adventurer. In 1981 LOF sold her to Petrostar Co Ltd of Saudi Arabia who renamed her Petrostar XVI.

On 5 April 1986 during the Tanker War phase of the Iran–Iraq War she was off Halul Island en route from Bahrain to Sharjah when Iranian helicopters hit her with AGM-65 Maverick missiles. Her accommodation was gutted by fire and four crewmembers were killed. She was towed to Sharjah where she was declared a constructive total loss on 9 April 1986 and laid up for disposal. She was sold to National Ship Demolition Co Ltd of Taiwan, arrived Kaohsiung on 24 January 1987 and her demolition began on 19 February 1987.

References

Sources and further reading

External links

 

1962 ships
Leaf-class tankers
Maritime incidents in 1986
Ship fires
Ships built in Emden
Ships of London and Overseas Freighters
Tankers of the Royal Fleet Auxiliary
Tankers of the United Kingdom
Iran–Iraq War
Iran–United Kingdom military relations